"Pack Your Bags" is a song by Joanne, released in March 1999 as the second single from her 2001 debut album, Do Not Disturb. The song debuted and peaked No. 54 on the ARIA charts; Joanne's lowest charting single in Australia.

Track listings
Australian CD single:
 "Pack Your Bags" [radio edit] – 3:18
 "Pack Your Bags" [radio extended mix] – 4:45
 "Pack Your Bags" [Bullet Proof mix] – 4:20
 "Pack Your Bags" [After 3 club mix] – 7:28
 "Pack Your Bags" [Freak Me R&B mix] – 4:49

Australian limited edition CD single:
 "Pack Your Bags" [radio edit] — 3:18
 "Pack Your Bags" [radio extended mix] – 4:45
 "Pack Your Bags" [Bullet Proof mix] – 4:20
 "Pack Your Bags" [After 3 club mix] – 7:28
 "Pack Your Bags" [Freak Me R&B mix] – 4:49
 "Jackie" [radio edit] (Stenberg/Kelly) – 4:05
 "Jackie" [XL club mix] (Stenberg/Kelly) – 8:18

Charts

References

1999 singles
Joanne Accom songs
1999 songs